Joyce Jameson (born Joyce Beverly Kingsley; September 26, 1932 – January 16, 1987) was an American actress, known for many television roles, including recurring guest appearances as Skippy, one of the "fun girls" in the 1960s television series The Andy Griffith Show as well as "the Blonde" in the Academy Award-winning The Apartment (1960).

Early life
Jameson was born Joyce Beverly Kingsley on September 26, 1932, in Chicago. She graduated from UCLA with a Bachelor of Arts degree.

Career

Films

Jameson began work in the early 1950s with numerous uncredited roles in films and television. She made her film debut in 1951 playing a chorus girl dancer in the motion picture Show Boat. Other notable film credits of that early period included Problem Girls (1953), Tip on a Dead Jockey (1957) and The Apartment  (1960).

In 1962, she starred with Vincent Price and Peter Lorre in the Roger Corman horror film Tales of Terror as Annabel Herringbone. She played Lorre's vulgar, unfaithful wife, and during the course of the film, she and her paramour (Price) were locked up in Lorre's wine cellar. One year later, she again starred with Lorre and Price in the raucous comedy The Comedy of Terrors (released in 1964). In 1964, she appeared as a hotel hooker in the comedy Good Neighbor Sam, starring Jack Lemmon and Romy Schneider.

In 1966, she starred as Abigail in the Elvis Presley film Frankie and Johnny and in Boy, Did I Get a Wrong Number! with Bob Hope and Elke Sommer. She also appeared in 1968's The Split, a crime film with Jim Brown and Warren Oates, and in an unsold comedy pilot for CBS titled The Mouse That Roared.

Jameson had roles in Death Race 2000 (1975) playing Grace Pander, The Outlaw Josey Wales (1976) as Rose, Every Which Way but Loose (1978), and Hardbodies (1984).

Television
Jameson was also a television actress. She was a regular member of the cast on Club Oasis. She made two appearances on Perry Mason: first as Lorraine Iverson who killed her husband in the 1963 episode "The Case of the Floating Stones", then as Dolly Jameson in the 1965 episode, "The Case of the Feather Cloak". She also had roles on The Dick Van Dyke Show (in the episode "A Day in the Life of Alan Brady"), Gunsmoke, Stagecoach West, The Twilight Zone, The Man from U.N.C.L.E (The Dippy Blonde Affair), McHale's Navy, My Favorite Martian, The New Phil Silvers Show, The Munsters, and F-Troop. Also, in 1966, she was Irene in the Gomer Pyle episode, "Vacation in Las Vegas". And not long after, she had a couple of roles in Hogan's Heroes (in the January 1967 episode "The Great Brinksmeyer Robbery" as Mady Pleiffer, and again later that same year in "Sgt. Schultz Meets Mata Hari" as Gestapo agent Eva Mueller), Alias Smith and Jones, Emergency! and Barney Miller.  She appeared in The Rockford Files (in the 1974 episode "The Dexter Crisis" as Marge White). Later she appeared in Charlie's Angels, The Feather and Father Gang, and The Love Boat.

Her ongoing role as Skippy paired with Daphne (played by Jean Carson) in The Andy Griffith Show established The Fun Girls.

Jameson provided one of the voices for the cartoon series Jokebook.

Jameson also was co-host of Tempo III, a program on KHJ-TV in Los Angeles.

Stage
Jameson's Broadway credits include The Billy Barnes Revue (1959), Venus at Large (1961) and The Billy Barnes People (1961).

Personal life
She married actor/songwriter Billy Barnes in the 1950s, and they had one child together, son Tyler, before their divorce. Subsequently, Jameson was a longtime girlfriend of The Man from U.N.C.L.E. star Robert Vaughn. She acted opposite Vaughn as the guest star on a 1966 U.N.C.L.E. episode "The Dippy Blond Affair".

According to Vaughn's autobiography, A Fortunate Life, Jameson suffered from depression. She was also an insomniac and regularly took Miltown to help her sleep.

Death
On January 16, 1987, Jameson died by suicide by overdosing on pills at the age of 54. Her body was cremated and her ashes scattered at sea.

Filmography

References

External links

 
 
 
 
 

1932 births
1987 deaths
1987 suicides
Actresses from Chicago
American film actresses
American television actresses
Drug-related suicides in California
20th-century American actresses